Sherwood Family Estate is a historic farm and national historic district located at Delhi in Delaware County, New York. The district contains four contributing buildings and one contributing site.  It was developed over the period 1801 to about 1925 and is composed of six estate buildings, a designed landscape, and an agricultural landscape.  Buildings include the residence, ice house, garage, laundry, and spring house.

It was listed on the National Register of Historic Places in 2002.

See also
National Register of Historic Places listings in Delaware County, New York

References

National Register of Historic Places in Delaware County, New York
Historic districts on the National Register of Historic Places in New York (state)